The Singapore Scout Association ("SSA") is one of the oldest youth movements in Singapore.

History

Scouting was first introduced in Singapore in 1908 but was officially founded on 2 July 1910. A young Scoutmaster named Frank Cooper Sands arrived from Nottingham in September 1910 and spent the next 40 years helping to create the Singapore Scout Association.  He is often called the "Father of Malayan Scouting". Starting with a small troop of 30 boys, the movement has grown immensely over the last 90 years, surviving two world wars and producing countless leaders in every sphere of human endeavour. Scouting for local boys only started in 1919 by Captain N.M. Hashim and A.Z. Alsagoff. From 1922 schools in Singapore adopted the Scout Programme as an extra-curricular activity resulting in the formation of school-sponsored troops registered as 2nd Raffles Institution, 3rd Anglo-Chinese School and 4th St Joseph Institution. Although the 04 St Joseph's Pelandok Scout Group was formed in the 1911, 2nd Raffles Institution, subsequently renamed 02 Raffles Scout Group, is currently the oldest continuous-functioning scout troop after the 1st Sand's Troop disbanded.

From 1963 to 1965 the SSA formed part of the Scout Association of Malaysia.

Present

Today, there are 10,722 Scouts in Singapore serving in four mainstream Scout sections. Each section caters to the needs of Scouts in a specific age range through its different program focus. The Cub Scout section comprises youths between ages 7 and 12 (primary school) while the scout section is made up of youths from 12 to 16 (secondary school). In addition, there are the Venture Scout and Rover Scout sections which accept youths between the ages of 15 and 18 and young adults from 17 to 25 respectively. Besides the mainstream Scout sections, there is also the Sea Scout section, which comprises Sea Scouts, Sea Venture Scouts and Sea Rover Scouts, and the Extension Scouts which is open to all physically or mentally disadvantaged youths who enjoy Scouting.

Previously, there was also the Air Scout section which was abolished. However, in 2011, the Air Scout programme has been restarted and the section has been renamed as Black Knights Air Scouts. On 24 March 2012, an investiture ceremony was held to officially welcome the latest batch of Air Scout Rovers. Some 20 students and two lecturers from ITE College Central's Black Knights Air Scouts, completed the airborne training conducted by the Royal Thai Air Force (RTAF) from 5 to 8 July 2012, during their Overseas Training Program 2012, in Bangkok, Thailand.

Scouting in Singapore is not only available to schools but also to the general community. The Scout units based in community are usually open units. They often work hand in hand with their respective RCs with community projects while using these RCs as their Scout's "base". There are also several foreign Scout groups, mainly the international schools, in Singapore that actively participate in the Singapore National & Area Scouting events.

The emblem uses the red and white from the Flag of Singapore, plus the 5 stars and crescent symbolizing unity of Scouts regardless of ethnic origin, religion or mother language.

Singapore Scout Association

The President of the Republic of Singapore is the Chief Scout. The Chief Scout holds the highest authority in the SSA and grants warrants and awards to uniformed adult leaders and commissioners who are recommended by the Association Headquarters. The Chief Scout also awards deserving and outstanding youth members who have attained the Standards of the Highest Award — the President's Scout Award.

The Association Headquarters is led by the Scout Council, which comprises both the uniformed and lay officials who assist the Chief Scout in his functions. The Scout Council is responsible for finding funds to support the Association's activities and provides strategic direction and financial oversight on the Association while the Commissioners' Council formulates operational policies and directives in the respective fields and departments. The Area Council and the Districts implement the various National policies and directives to the grassroot units. Full-time professional staff provide day-to-day management of the Association Headquarters and provide support services to Commissioners' Council and Scout Council.

The Scout Council is headed by an elected President of the Association, together with his Vice Presidents and Council members. There are several committees formed up to look into the various aspects of the Association including the Finance Committee, Uniform Committee, and Scout Shop Committee.

The Commissioner's Council is the highest operational policy and directive body headed by Chief Commissioner. The Commissioner's Council structure as follows:

Chief Commissioner
Deputy Chief Commissioners
Assistant Chief Commissioners
National Training Commissioner
National Programme Commissioner
Area Commissioners
Membership Growth Commissioner
Partnership Commissioner
Adult Resource Commissioner
Programme Resource Commissioner
International/Relations Commissioner
District Commissioner

The National Training Commissioner is the head of National Training Team whose role is to provide adult leader training towards Woodbadge.

The National Program Commissioner is the head of National Program Council whose role is to provide Scouting Programs and updates for all youth members.

The International/Relations Commissioner is the head of International/Relations Department that handles both relations within Singapore and internationally.

Bid for 23rd World Scout Jamboree
The SSA made a bid to host the 23rd World Scout Jamboree, to be sited at its campsite on Coney Island in 2015. In a decision made at the World Scout Conference in 2008, the Jamboree was awarded to the Scout Association of Japan .

See also
Girl Guides Singapore
Cub Scouts (Singapore Scout Association)
World Buddhist Scout Brotherhood

References

External links
Official website
BSA Sea Scout official website
Singapore Scout Guild
Singapore Rovers resource website

Singaporean voluntary welfare organisations
World Organization of the Scout Movement member organizations
Scouting and Guiding in Singapore
Youth organizations established in 1910